Ville Jacques-Cartier was a city located on the south shore of Montreal, Quebec, Canada. It was named after the founder of New France, Jacques Cartier. Now a defunct city, its former territory makes up a third of the city of Longueuil and more than 80% of Le Vieux-Longueuil borough.

History
Created at the same time as Mackayville in 1947, the land of Jacques-Cartier corresponded to what had been left of the St-Antoine de Longueuil Parish after Longueuil, Saint-Lambert, Saint-Hubert, Montréal-Sud, Greenfield Park and Mackayville seceded from the parish. In 1948, a distant section of Jacques-Cartier (with no boundaries to the rest of the town) went on to form an independent municipality under the name of Préville. In 1949, Jacques-Cartier lost another portion of its territory which became Ville LeMoyne. Originally incorporated as a town, Jacques-Cartier gained the status of city in 1952.

Jacques-Cartier grew extremely quickly, much too fast for its existing infrastructure. It lacked a sewer system and paved roads. Dogs ran wildly in the streets. Houses were built as soon as the owner had the materials required to make one. The city had few or no laws on architectural integrity. This led to a mishmash of buildings, some of concrete, some of wood, some of brick, along its streets.

Jacques-Cartier merged with the city of Longueuil in 1969. Although the territory of Jacques-Cartier was four times larger than that of Longueuil, it was the latter's name that was retained because of historic reasons (Longueuil was a much older city than Jacques-Cartier).

Today, the western part of what used to be Jacques-Cartier is primarily low-income, highly populated, retail-oriented and completely built-up. The architecture in this area can be defined as a mishmash and non-uniform, as buildings were usually constructed when the property owners had enough money to build them. The eastern part, on the other hand, tends to be the opposite. It is by far less densely populated than its western counterpart and contains the industrial section of Longueuil. Recently built designer mansions and condominiums are plentiful (notably in the Collectivité-Nouvelle and Parcours du Cerf neighbourhoods), and the area is becoming increasing built up. The far northeast known as the Fatima neighbourhood (which borders the city of Boucherville) is similar to the western part, with many bungalows and apartment buildings dating from Jacques-Cartier.

During its 22 years of existence, Jacques-Cartier gave birth to some of the most well-known establishments of Le Vieux-Longueuil borough; notably Collège Édouard-Montpetit (1967), Gérard-Fillion secondary school (1966), and the current location of Pratt & Whitney Canada (1951).

Government
The city hall, police station and fire station of Jacques-Cartier were all located together on Cure-Poirier Boulevard between the streets Daniel and Brebeuf. This site still serve as an office building for the modern city of Longueuil and also include a fire station.

Mayors

Demographics

Jacques-Cartier was overwhelmingly francophone. It had twelve Catholic parishes at the time of its merger with Longueuil in 1969. The clergy played a large role in the success of the community. It ran various social organizations and was in charge of education in the city.

Education

The South Shore Protestant Regional School Board previously served the municipality.

Location (1969)

References

External links
Marigot.ca - Historical information on Ville Jacques-Cartier from Michel Pratt, Atlas historique de Longueuil
- Map of Ville Jacques-Cartier from Michel Pratt, Atlas historique de Longueuil

1947 establishments in Quebec
Populated places established in 1947
Populated places disestablished in 1969
Former municipalities in Quebec
Longueuil
1969 disestablishments in Quebec